The Roman Catholic Diocese of Tanjungkarang is a diocese located in the city of Tanjungkarang in the Ecclesiastical province of Palembang in Indonesia.

History
 June 19, 1952: Established as the Apostolic Prefecture of Tandjung-Karang from the Apostolic Vicariate of Palembang
 January 3, 1961: Promoted as Diocese of Tandjung-Karang
 August 22, 1973: Renamed as Diocese of Tanjungkarang

Leadership
 Bishops of Tanjungkarang (Roman rite)
 Bishop Yohanes Harun Yuwono (elected 19 July 2013)
 Bishop Andreas Henrisusanta, S.C.I. (April 18, 1979 – July 6, 2012)
 Bishop Albert Hermelink Gentiaras, S.C.I. (August 22, 1973 – April 18, 1979)
 Bishops of Tandjung-Karang (Roman Rite) 
 Bishop Albert Hermelink Gentiaras, S.C.I. (January 3, 1961 – August 22, 1973)
 Prefects Apostolic of Tandjung-Karang (Roman Rite) 
 Fr. Albert Hermelink Gentiaras, S.C.I. (later Bishop) (June 27, 1952 – January 3, 1961)

References
 GCatholic.org
 Catholic Hierarchy

Roman Catholic dioceses in Indonesia
Christian organizations established in 1952
Roman Catholic dioceses and prelatures established in the 20th century
1952 establishments in Indonesia